People with the name Ortis include:
 Ortis Deley (born 1973), British television presenter and actor
 Venanzio Ortis (born 1955), Italian athlete
 Jacopo Ortis, fictional character in the novel The Last Letters of Jacopo Ortis and the film Jacobo Ortis

See also 
 Ortiz, a Spanish-language surname
 Ortiz (disambiguation)